The Carmel Valley Historical Society (CVHS) is a non-profit organization dedicated to preserving and promoting the history of the Carmel Valley region of California. Since its establishment in 1987, the society has played an instrumental role in uncovering and preserving the rich heritage of Carmel Valley, including its natural beauty, cultural diversity, and unique architecture. Through its archival work, events and programs, and efforts to restore historic landmarks, the CVHS is ensuring that the heritage of Carmel Valley is not lost to future generations.

History

The first meeting of the Carmel Valley Historical Society (CVHS) took place on February 10, 1987 in the Fellowship Hall at the Carmel Valley Community Chapel with 25 people attending. A collections committee had its first meeting at Rosie’s Cracker Barrel on March 9, 1987. The committee acquired a collection of artifacts and memorabilia, including working with local decedents of the Rumsen and Esselen tribes to gather historical information. CVHS was incorporated and became a non-profit organization with a 501(C)(3) status. In 1991, a board of directors was formed, and the Society became a member of the Conference of California Historical Societies and the Carmel Valley Chamber of Commerce. CVHS seeks to document and showcase the history of Carmel Valley, from its early Native American inhabitants to the Spanish and Mexican periods, through the American era and up to the present day.

CVHS's founding members raised funds to purchase and remodel a building in the Village for research, education, and display of their archives. Past Chairman Stew Clough (1987-1991) and Marvin Pylate (1991) organized and conducted many field trips. Clough held meetings and speeches at local clubs and schools, retirement homes, and libraries promoting the Society. Clough also spearheaded the Carmel Valley’s 1889-1989 Centennial celebration which drew statewide attention and attracted many prominent people.

On January 5, 2009, the Carmel Valley History Center for its museum broke ground and was completed in early 2012. The architects were Marj Ingram and Joseph Hertlein. It opened to the public on December 7, 2013. The  building, designed as a Western barn, is located just north of the Carmel Valley Road on donated land on the southeast corner of the Carmel Valley Village’s Community Center's Park. Two-thirds of the building's space is used to exhibit 150 years of artifacts from Carmel Valley's history. The Carmel Valley Village Improvement Committee purchased and gave the land to the parks and recreation department.

Exhibits at CVHS bring the history of Carmel Valley up-close and personal. They have included the Robles del Rio story, the Joan Baez exhibit, the Ranching exhibit, the Carmel Valley Fire Department exhibit, and more. The Society’s Exhibit Committee supports the curator throughout the development of each exhibit. Exhibits can also go on the road, which have included the Discovery Center at Palo Corona Regional Park and in the gallery at the Carmel Valley Library.

The CVHS's primary goal has been the documenting of oral histories from old timers who knew the valley when farming and ranching were the primary way of life. Audio and video tapes capture insight into historic Carmel Valley life. As many vintage homes and barns were being lost to “progress,” CVHS proceeded to identify and photograph vintage homes and barns connected with Carmel Valley’s early history. CVHS conducts many fund raisers including an annual Rummage Sale, an annual Cowboy Show, and participates in the yearly Carmel Valley Fiesta.

Founding member and local artist Julia Harvey designed the CVHS's logo. It was then made into a limited-edition buckle design for the 1889-1989 Carmel Valley Centennial by Carmel Valley silversmith Ken Ramoni and was produced in sterling silver by Diablo Manufacturing Co., of Grass Valley, California. In May 1990, Harvey provided a motto for CVHS, Dedicated to the future of our past.

Research library

One of the primary goals of the CVHS is to collect and preserve historical artifacts, documents, and photographs related to the history of Carmel Valley. Over 400 items are stored in a specially designed research library at the Society's headquarters. The research library contains a wealth of information about the family histories, documents, periodicals, photographs, and books on the history of Carmel Valley.

Books on the history of Monterey County and California are included as historical views of events impacting Carmel Valley history. The books and documents are arranged by category and copies can be made for a small fee. CVHS publishes books, and records filmed histories of notable figures who have contributed to the development of Carmel Valley.

In March 2010, founding member and historian Elizabeth Barratt and CVHS wrote the book Images of America, Carmel Valley, about Carmel Valley’s history, its early inhabitants, mission days, and the rancho era.

Events and programs

In addition to its archival work, the CVHS hosts regular events and programs that are designed to promote the history and culture of Carmel Valley. These events include lectures, tours, and special exhibitions that showcase the region's natural beauty, unique architecture, and cultural heritage. The Society also publishes a quarterly newsletter, which provides updates on the latest news and events related to the organization and its activities. The online newsletter archives go from the latest newsletter back to the July/November 1990 newsletter.

On September 11, 2019, CVHS member and historian, Jeff Ohlson spoke at Double Nickels luncheon about his book, A History of Ranching in Carmel Valley. The book documents the Valley’s history of ranches, ranchers, and cowhands, with two dozen biographies of ranch histories.

The CVHS is staffed by a team of volunteers who help preserve the history of Carmel Valley. These volunteers include historians, archivists, educators, and community members who are committed to sharing their knowledge and expertise with others.

Perhaps one of the most significant accomplishments of the CVHS is its efforts to restore and preserve historic buildings and landmarks in Carmel Valley. On March 17, 2022, CVHS commemorated the former Carmel Valley Vintage Airfield with a historic marker and Supervisorial Proclamation. The sign was donated by CVHS. The proclamation was presented by Monterey County 5th District Supervisor Mary Adams. By preserving these important landmarks, CVHS is ensuring that future generations will be able to appreciate and learn from the rich history of the valley.

Artifacts

Videos

 Video Interview with CVHS founder Dolores McGlochlin (2013)

Publications

See also
 List of historical societies

References

External links
 
 Official website
 Carmel Valley History Center
 Carmel Valley Roadco

Organizations established in 1987
Historical societies of the United States
American historians
Carmel Valley, California
Organizations based in California
1987 establishments in California